Ranam station is a railway station located in Ranam-guyok, Chongjin, North Korea. It is located on the Pyongra Line, which connects the capital, Pyongyang, to Rason, a major port city.

History
It was originally opened by the Japanese as Ranan station, and played an important part in World War II, when Ranam was a headquarters of the Japanese Korean Army.

Railway stations in North Korea
Chongjin
Buildings and structures in North Hamgyong Province